Sanhe is a town in  Wudu District, Longnan, Gansu, People's Republic of China, located  southeast of downtown Longnan as the crow flies. , it has 16 villages under its administration.

See also
List of township-level divisions of Gansu

References

Township-level divisions of Gansu
Longnan